Kozza Smith (born Korey Williams on 20 March 1988 in Cessnock, New South Wales) is an Australian motorcycle speedway rider.

Career history 
Smith began racing at the age of 14 in Australian junior speedway and in 2006, he won the Queensland under-21 state championship. He moved to the United Kingdom and joined his first senior club, King's Lynn Stars, for the 2008 Premier League season. The Stars reached the final of the Premier League play-offs but lost to the Edinburgh Monarchs. He was announced in the King's Lynn 2009 team and signed for Elite League team the Ipswich Witches as a doubling up rider with Carl Wilkinson.

In 2011 he doubled up in the Premier League with Berwick Bandits, going on to ride with the team for three seasons. He signed for King's Lynn and Redcar Bears for 2014, but was refused a visa to ride in the UK.

Smith won the Australian Longtrack Championship in 2012.

World Final Appearances

Under-21 World Cup
 2008 -  Holsted - 4th - 33pts (1)

See also
 Australia national speedway team
 Australia national under-21 speedway team

References 

1988 births
Living people
Australian speedway riders
King's Lynn Stars riders
Ipswich Witches riders
Berwick Bandits riders
People from the Hunter Region
Sportsmen from New South Wales